Buyeo (夫餘) was an ancient kingdom in Northeast Asia.

Buyeo may also refer to:

Buyeo County, in South Chungcheong Province, South Korea
Buyeo language, the language of the Buyeo kingdom
Fuyu, Jilin, a city in Jilin Province, China
Queen Mother Buyeo